Luc Blanchette is a Canadian politician in Quebec, who was elected to the National Assembly of Quebec in the 2014 election. He represented the electoral district of Rouyn-Noranda–Témiscamingue as a member of the Quebec Liberal Party. He was initially appointed Minister for Mines and Minister responsible for the Abitibi-Témiscamingue region and the Nord-du-Québec region, and then on August 20, 2016, he left the Mines portfolio and became Minister of Forests, Wildlife and Parks. He was defeated in the 2018 election.

References

Quebec Liberal Party MNAs
Living people
Members of the Executive Council of Quebec
French Quebecers
People from Abitibi-Témiscamingue
21st-century Canadian politicians
1960 births